Suzanne Strudwick (born 4 July 1965 in Cheshire, England) is an English professional golfer. She turned professional in 1983 and joined the Women Professional Golfers' European Tour (now the Ladies European Tour) the same year. In 1993 she joined the U.S.-based LPGA Tour and was rookie of the year in her first season. She made the top 100 on the LPGA Tour money list nine times, but never rose higher than 68th.

Strudwick played a full tournament schedule until 2004, and now runs her own golf academy based in Knoxville, Tennessee, United States.

Strudwick is now a full-time golf coach at Carson–Newman University in Jefferson City, Tennessee.

Ladies European Tour wins
1989 Open de France Dames
1991 AGF Ladies' Open

External links

English female golfers
Ladies European Tour golfers
LPGA Tour golfers
College golf coaches in the United States
Sportspeople from Cheshire
1965 births
Living people